The Carroll's Number 1 Tournament was a professional 72-hole stroke play golf tournament played in the Republic of Ireland. It was inaugurated by sponsors Carroll's in 1965 as a means of providing more playing opportunities to Irish professionals, and a qualification route for the existing Carroll's International. It ran for four years, although it was abandoned in the first year due to bad weather, until it was replaced by the Carroll's Irish Match Play Championship in 1969.

Winners

References

Golf tournaments in the Republic of Ireland
1965 establishments in Ireland
1968 disestablishments in Ireland
Recurring sporting events established in 1965
Recurring sporting events disestablished in 1968